The Ecclesiastical Commissioners Act 1847 (10 & 11 Vict c 108), sometimes called the Bishopric of Manchester Act 1847, is an Act of the Parliament of the United Kingdom with the principal purpose of delegating to the Ecclesiastical Commissioners for England the power to put forward a scheme (a form of secondary legislation) to create the Diocese of Manchester. The Ecclesiastical Commissioners scheme containing the precise arrangements for the diocesan changes was put forward to Queen Victoria at Osborne House in the Isle of Wight, on 10 August 1847, where it was assented to in Chambers. 
 
Whilst the Act was primarily a procedural enabling device to provide the legal framework for a relatively minor reorganisation within the Church of England, and would normally have ceased to be relevant once the scheme for the creation of the dioceses had been assented to, it incorporated provisions which set the number of Lords Spiritual in the House of Lords at 26, irrespective of the number of bishoprics in England, and created the mechanism for the determining the membership of the Lords Spiritual.

The bill was the subject of debate in the House of Lords at the time, regarding whether "The limitation of the number of Lords Spiritual which it was proposed to establish by this Bill, was not only an infringement of the prerogatives of the Crown, but he also considered that it was a dangerous invasion of the rights and privileges of all the Members of their Lordships' House, temporal and spiritual" as it was Government legislation which sought to control the membership of the House of Lords through limiting the ability of the exercise of Royal Prerogative in the right of issuing writs of summons to call a Bishop to the House of Lords that "with respect to the Peerage of this country, this was the first time it had ever been proposed to interfere with the right conferred by it".

Preamble
The preamble, to "Church of Wales and" was repealed by section 1 of, and the Schedule to, the Statute Law Revision Act 1891. The words "for England" were repealed by section 1 of, and the First Schedule to, the Statute Law Revision Act 1894.

Section 1
This section from "so much" to "and that", was repealed by section 1 of, and the Schedule to, the Statute Law Revision Act 1875. The words "for England" were repealed by section 1 of, and the First Schedule to, the Statute Law Revision Act 1894.

Section 2
This section, to "enacted that" and from "and whenever" to the end of the section, was repealed by section 1 of, and the Schedule to, the Statute Law Revision Act 1891.

Section 3
This section was repealed by section 1 of, and the Schedule to, the Statute Law Revision Act 1875.

References 
Halsbury's Statutes of England. (The Complete Statutes of England). First Edition. Butterworth & Co (Publishers) Ltd. 1929. Volume 6. Page 94.
The Statutes: Second Revised Edition. Printed under the authority of HMSO. London. 1894. Volume 8. Pages 290 and 291.
"Statute and Order in Council creating the Bishopric of Manchester". The Manchester Municipal Code. Solicitors' Law Stationery Society. 1899. Volume 5:   . Page 299.
Ivor Bowen. The Statutes of Wales. T Fisher Unwin. 1908. Pages xxi and 264 to 266.

English law
United Kingdom Acts of Parliament 1847
Acts of the Parliament of the United Kingdom concerning the House of Lords